The Boston mayoral election of 1917 occurred on Tuesday, December 18, 1917. Andrew James Peters, Assistant Secretary of the Treasury, defeated incumbent Mayor of Boston James Michael Curley and two other candidates.

Peters was inaugurated on Monday, February 4, 1918.

Candidates
 James Michael Curley, Mayor of Boston since 1914, former member of the United States House of Representatives (1913–1914)
 James A. Gallivan, member of the United States House of Representatives since 1914, former member of the Massachusetts Senate (1897–1898) and the Massachusetts House of Representatives (1895–1896)
 Andrew James Peters, Assistant Secretary of the Treasury since 1914, former member of the United States House of Representatives (1907–1914) and the Massachusetts Senate (1904–1905)
 Peter Francis Tague, member of the United States House of Representatives since 1915, former member of the Massachusetts Senate (1899–1900) and the Massachusetts House of Representatives (1897–1898, 1913–1914)

Results

See also
List of mayors of Boston, Massachusetts

References

Further reading
 
 

Boston mayoral
Boston
1917
Non-partisan elections
1910s in Boston